Thomas Fellowes may refer to:

Thomas Fellowes (Royal Navy officer, born 1827) (1827–1923)
Thomas Fellowes (Royal Navy officer, born 1778) (1778–1853)

See also
Thomas Fellows (disambiguation)